The No Shoes Nation Tour is the thirteenth headlining concert tour by American country music singer Kenny Chesney, in support of his fifteenth studio album Life on a Rock (2013). It began on March 16, 2013 at Raymond James Stadium in Tampa, Florida and ended on August 24 at Gillette Stadium in Foxborough, Massachusetts.

Setlist
 

"Feel Like a Rock Star"		
"Reality" 		
"Beer in Mexico"
"Keg In The Closet"
"Pirate Flag"	
"Summertime" 		
"No Shoes No Shirt, No Problems" 		
"Welcome To The Fishbowl"	
"Somewhere with You"
"I Go Back" 		
"On The Coast of Somewhere Beautiful" 		
"You and Tequila" 		
"Living in Fast Forward" 		
"Young"	
"How Forever Feels" 		
"Everybody Wants to Go to Heaven"	
"Big Star"
"Come Over" 		
"Don't Happen Twice" 		
"Never Wanted Nothing More" 		
"Anything but Mine"	
"Old Blue Chair" 		
"When the Sun Goes Down" 		
"Out Last Night" 		
"The Boys of Fall" 		
Encore 		
"She Thinks My Tractor's Sexy"

Tour Dates

References

2013 concert tours
Co-headlining concert tours
Kenny Chesney concert tours
Zac Brown Band concert tours